Amadou Sidibé (born 19 February 1986) is a Malian former professional footballer who played as a left-back.

Club career
Born in Bamako, Mali, Sidibé began his career at his local club, Cercle Olympique de Bamako.

In 2008, he transferred to AJ Auxerre from Djoliba Athletic Club. In 2015 he joined lower-league side Club Olympique Avallon, before returning to Auxerre in summer 2017.

International career
Sidibé represented his homeland Mali at 2008 Africa Cup of Nations in Ghana.

References

External links
 AJ Auxerre
 

1986 births
Living people
Sportspeople from Bamako
Association football fullbacks
Malian footballers
Malian expatriate footballers
Mali international footballers
2008 Africa Cup of Nations players
Djoliba AC players
CO de Bamako players
AJ Auxerre players
Ligue 1 players
Expatriate footballers in France
21st-century Malian people